The SS Ourang Medan was a supposed ghost ship which, according to various sources, became a shipwreck in the Dutch East Indies (modern Indonesia) in the Straits of Malacca waters, or elsewhere, after its entire crew had died under suspicious circumstances, either in 1940, 1947 or 1948, depending on the newspaper source. Most people agree that the story of the Ourang Medan is an urban legend due to the fact that there were never records of a ship named the Ourang Medan.

The mystery of the SS Ourang Medan  
One English reference to the ship and the incident was published in the May 1952 issue of the Proceedings of the Merchant Marine Council, published by the United States Coast Guard.  An earlier English reference was published on October 10, 1948 in The Albany Times of Albany, New York and references its original source as Elsevier's Weekly.  The word Ourang (also written Orang) is Malay or Indonesian for "man" or "person", whereas Medan is the largest city on the Indonesian island of Sumatra, giving an approximate translation of "Man of Medan". Accounts of the ship's accident have appeared in various books and magazines, mainly on Forteana. Their factual accuracy and even the ship's existence, however, are unconfirmed, and details of the vessel's construction and history, if any, remain unknown. Searches for any official registration or accident investigation recorded  have proven unsuccessful.

The story's first appearance was a series of three articles in the Dutch-Indonesian newspaper De locomotief: Samarangsch handels- en advertentie-blad (February 3, 1948, with two photographs, February 28, 1948, and March 13, 1948). The second and third articles describe the experiences of the sole survivor of the Ourang Medan crew, who was found by an Italian missionary and natives on Taongi Atoll in the Marshall Islands. The man, before perishing, tells the missionary that the ship was carrying a badly stowed cargo of oil of vitriol, and that most of the crew perished because of the poisonous fumes escaping from broken containers. According to the story, the Ourang Medan was sailing from an unnamed small Chinese port to Costa Rica, and deliberately avoided the authorities. The survivor, an unnamed German, died after telling his story to the missionary, who told the story to the author, Silvio Scherli of Trieste, Italy. The Dutch newspaper concludes with a disclaimer: "This is the last part of our story about the mystery of the Ourang Medan. We must repeat that we don't have any other data on this 'mystery of the sea'. Nor can we answer the many unanswered questions in the story. It may seem obvious that the entire story is a fantasy, a thrilling romance of the sea. On the other hand, the author, Silvio Scherli, assures us of the authenticity of the story." Silvio Scherli is said to have produced a report on Trieste "Export Trade" on September 28, 1959.

New evidence found by The Skittish Library shows there were 1940 newspaper reports of the incident taken from the Associated Press in British newspapers the Daily Mirror and the Yorkshire Evening Post. Again, there were differences in the story: the location being the Solomon Islands, and the SOS messages different from later reports. The story still appears to originate with Silvio Scherli in Trieste.

Circumstances 
According to the story, at some point of time in or around June 1947 (Gaddis and others list the approximate date as early February 1948), two American vessels navigating the Straits of Malacca, the City of Baltimore and the Silver Star, among others passing by, picked up several distress messages from the nearby Dutch merchant ship Ourang Medan. A radio operator aboard the troubled vessel sent the following message in Morse code: "S.O.S. from Ourang Medan * * * We float. All officers including the captain, dead in chartroom and on the bridge. Probably whole of crew dead * * *." A few confused dots and dashes (of Morse code) later, two words came through clearly.  They were  "I die." Then, after that chilling message, there was nothing more heard of. When the Silver Star crew eventually located and boarded the apparently-undamaged Ourang Medan in an attempt at a rescue, the ship was found littered with corpses (including the carcass of a dog) everywhere, with the dead bodies found sprawled on their backs, the frozen (and allegedly badly-frightened) faces of the deceased upturned to the sun above with mouths gaping open and eyes staring straight ahead, with the corpses resembling horrible caricatures. No survivors were located and no visible signs of injuries on the dead bodies were observed. Just as the ship was to be prepared for a tow by the Silver Star to a nearby port, a fire then suddenly broke out in the ship's No. 4 cargo-hold, forcing the boarding party to hastily evacuate the doomed Dutch freighter, thus preventing any further investigations to be carried out. Soon after, the Ourang Medan was witnessed exploding before finally sinking.

Theories

Unsecured hazardous materials cargo 

Bainton and others hypothesize that Ourang Medan might have been involved in smuggling operations of chemical substances such as a combination of potassium cyanide and nitroglycerin or even wartime stocks of nerve agents. According to these theories, sea water would have entered the ship's hold, reacting with the cargo to release toxic gases, which then caused the crew to succumb to asphyxia and/or poisoning. Later, the sea water would have reacted with the nitroglycerin, causing the reported fire and explosion.

Another theory is that the ship was transporting nerve gas which the Japanese military had been storing in China during the war, and which was handed over to the U.S. military at the end of the war. No U.S. ship could transport it as it would leave a paper trail. It was therefore loaded onto a non-registered ship for transport to the U.S. or an island in the Pacific.

Carbon monoxide (CO) poisoning 

Gaddis puts forward the theory that an undetected smouldering fire or malfunction in the ship's boiler system might have been responsible for the shipwreck. Escaping carbon monoxide would have caused the deaths of all aboard, with the fire slowly spreading out of control, leading to the vessel's ultimate destruction.

Skepticism 
Several authors note their inability to find any mention of the case in Lloyd's Shipping Register. Furthermore, no registration records for a ship by the name of Ourang Medan could be located in various countries, including the Netherlands. While author Roy Bainton states that the identity of the Silver Star, reported to have been involved in the failed rescue attempt, has been established with high probability, the complete lack of information on the sunken ship itself has given rise to suspicion about the origins and credibility of the account. Ships logs for the Silver Star did not show a record of any such rescue attempt. Bainton and others have put forward the possibility that accounts of, among others, the date, location, names of the ships involved, and circumstances of the accident might have been inaccurate or exaggerated, or that the story might be completely fictitious.

One British researcher has found the story of the Ourang Medan, transposed to the Solomon Islands, but also with a Trieste connection, in two British newspapers in 1940 (The Yorkshire Evening Post for 21 November 1940 and The Daily Mirror for 22 November 1940), both quoting AP (The Associated Press) news agency.

References

External links 
 An in-depth look at the 75+ Year Old Legend of The SS Ourang Medan
 An episode of the Thinking Sideways podcast about the ghost ship, featuring an interview with Roy Bainton.
 The Death Ship SS Ourang Medan. Modern research shows the story is almost certainly fictional. 

Shipwrecks in the Strait of Malacca
Merchant ships of the Netherlands
Pseudohistory
Maritime incidents in 1947
Ghost ships